La Chasse aux papillons is a 1992 French drama film written and directed by Otar Iosseliani.

Plot
Two older women, Marie-Agnès de Bayonette (Thamara Tarassachvili) and her cousin Solange (Narda Blanchet) live in a villa nestled in the hills over a nearby village. Surrounded by the wealth, memories, and treasures collected over their lifetimes, they purposely ignore real estate development interests from the nearby town, specially those led by repeated efforts of the local magistrate who urges them to sell their home to a Japanese investment group. They survive financially by the occasional sale of a piece of antique furniture. When Marie-Agnès dies unexpectedly, Solange has to deal with an heir from Moscow and renewed efforts that the estate be sold.

Cast
In casting his films, Otar Iosseliani admitted to preferring unknowns, feeling that a famous name could be equated to hiring a whore. In wishing to have viewer's feel like they were watching not actors but people, his casts were recruited mainly from his personal address book.
 Narda Blanchet as Solange
 Pierrette Pompom Bailhache as Valérie
 Aleksandr Cherkasov as Henri de Lampadere
 Thamara Tarassachvili as Marie-Agnès de Bayonette
 Alexandra Liebermann as Hélène
 Lilia Ollivier as Olga
 Emmanuel de Chauvigny as Father André
 Sacha Piatigorsky as Sultan
 Anne-Marie Eisenschitz as Marie
 Françoise Tsouladzé as Yvonne
 Maimouna N'Diaye as Caprice
 Yannick Carpentier as Monsieur Capentier

Release
The film had multiple international releases 1992 through 1995, and screened at the Thessaloniki International Film Festival in 2003. Its original French release title is La Chasse aux papillons, but it also screened as A Caça às Borboletas in Portugal, as Caccia alle farfalle in Italy, Jagd auf Schmetterlinge in Germany, as Kelebek avi in Turkey,  as Lepkevadászat in Hungary,  as Peplebze nadiroba (ნადირობა პეპლებზე) in Georgia, as Охота на бабочек in Russia,  as Polowanie na motyle in Poland, and as To kynigi tis petaloudas in Greece.  In English it was released as The Butterfly Hunt, Hunting Butterflies, and Chasing Butterflies.

Recognition

Critical response
The film was shown in 1993 Moscow International Film Festival as a part of the program which demonstrated award-winning 1992 films. In the reaction, it was noted that the film is typical for Otar Iosseliani in the sense that it gives the notion of the rytmus. The best scenes of the film are those where no dramatic action occurs. It was also noted that France as shown by Iosseliani is very much like Georgia as shown by him in previous films.

Awards and nominations
 1992, won a Confédération Internationale des Cinemas d'Art et d 'Essai (C.I.C.A.E.) Award at 49th Venice Film Festival 
 1992, won Pasinetti Award for 'Best Film'' at Venice Film Festival 
 1993, received a European Film Award nomination for 'Best Achievement' from European Film Academy 
 1993, won Andrei Tarkovsky Award at Moscow International Film Festival
 1993, received a Nika Award nomination for 'Best Film' from Russian Academy of Cinema Arts and Sciences.

References

External links
 

1992 films
French drama films
1990s French-language films
Films directed by Otar Iosseliani
1992 drama films
1990s French films